Abronia macrocarpa is a rare species of flowering plant known by the common name largefruit sand verbena. It is endemic to eastern Texas, where its current range is limited to Freestone, Leon, and Robertson counties. It inhabits harsh, open sand dunes on savannas, growing in deep, poor soils. It was first collected in 1968 and described as a new species in 1972. It is a federally listed endangered species of the United States.

Description
Abronia macrocarpa is a perennial herb with a hairy, glandular stem growing up to half a meter tall. The glandular oval leaf blades are up to 5 centimeters long by 3.5 wide and are borne on relatively long petioles. The inflorescence is a cluster of up to 75 magenta or light purple flowers each up to 3 centimeters long. The tubular, strongly fragrant flowers open at dusk and are pollinated by moths. The winged fruit is up to 1.5 centimeters long. It is dispersed by wind.

Its natural habitat is sandy soils with little other vegetation, often in openings of post-oak woodlands.

Threats to this endangered species include habitat loss as its range is consumed for development and oil exploration. The habitat is also damaged by off-road vehicles, people on foot and on horseback, fire suppression activity, and the invasion of non-native species such as bermudagrass and weeping lovegrass (Eragrostis curvula).

The total remaining number is estimated at several thousand individual plants in nine populations.

Life cycle 
Abronia macrocarpa flowers between February and May, often after heavy rainfall. It is pollinated by sphinx moths and disperses its fruit in the summer months, at which point the plants die back and re-emerge in the fall.

Historical uses
Native Americans used the roots and leaves to treat topical skin injuries, and the roots were at times mixed with cornmeal and used as food. The flowers were at later times used for scented oils and as dyes for wool.

References

External links
USDA Plants Profile of Abronia macrocarpa (Largefruit Sand Verbena)
USFWS: "Large-fruited Sand Verbena Recovery Plan" — Kennedy, K. and J. Poole. (1992).

macrocarpa
Endemic flora of Texas